Zȃzȇl The darker spirit (demon) of Saturn, mentioned as a spirit in such works as the  Key of Solomon. As it says on the 10th Plate: "The First Pentacle of Mercury.--It serveth to invoke the Spirits who are under the Firmament." Zazel is described as being one of the presiding spirits, either the forty-fifth or the forty-ninth, with 'Agȋȇl, of Saturn, and has been described as a great angel, invoked in Solomonic magic, who is "effective in love conjurations".

See also

 Lesser Key of Solomon
 Magical Treatise of Solomon
 Saturn#Ancient observations
 Testament of Solomon
 Zazel: The Scent of Love – erotic art film 1997

References

External links
 Plate X of the Key of Solomon

 The Key of Solomon the King

Individual angels